Noyers Abbey is a former Benedictine monastery located in Noyers, in the territory of the commune of Nouâtre, in the department of Indre-et-Loire. It was founded in the 11th century and dissolved in 1791 during the French Revolution.  It was an active centre of religious, moral, and agricultural influence in the lower Touraine and the area round Châtellerault.

History 
The foundation of the abbey was confirmed by Robert II of France in 1030–1031.

Sources 
 Abbé Casimir Chevalier, Histoire de l'Abbaye de Noyers d'après les chartes, December 1872.

References 

Buildings and structures in Indre-et-Loire
1030s establishments in France
11th-century churches in France
Benedictine monasteries in France